Lolo Fakaosilea (born 10 June 1995) is an Australian rugby union player. He currently plays as a flanker for Kintetsu Liners in the Top Challenge League in Japan.

Family and early life
Lolo Fakaosilea was born in Auckland, New Zealand but moved to Brisbane, Queensland with his family as a young boy. His father Seiana Fakaosilea had played for the Auckland Blues and also represented the inaugural New Zealand Tongan first XV that played trial matches against the Pacific Islanders.

Fakaosilea started his rugby at the age of five, playing for the Sunnybank Rugby junior club until he was twelve. He then moved to Emerald where he attended Marist College from 2009 to 2011. While playing rugby for Marist College he was selected in the Central Queensland Bushrangers team to play in the Queensland Junior State Championships. He returned to Brisbane for his senior high school years at Brisbane Boys College and St Patrick's College, Shorncliffe. Fakaosilea was selected for the Australian Schoolboys rugby team in 2012 and 2013.

Fakaosilea is also a nephew of the former All Black rugby star Jonah Lomu, and he is briefly mentioned in Lomu's autobiography.

Career
Fakaosilea played premier grade rugby for the Sunnybank  club. He was selected for the Australian Men's Youth Sevens team to play at the Youth Olympic Festival held at Sydney in 2013, before signing a one-year contract for the 2014 season, and then later on signing a further two-year contract with the Queensland Reds for the 2015 and 2016 seasons.

In 2014, he played for the Reds A team in the Pacific Rugby Cup, and was selected for the Australia U20 team to play at the 2014 IRB Junior World Championship held in New Zealand. Later that year Fakaosilea was named in the Queensland Country squad for the National Rugby Championship, but was sadly side lined, after sustaining a torn meniscus which resulted in needing surgery.

Fakaosilea made his Super Rugby debut for the Reds during the 2015 Super Rugby season, coming off the bench against the Hurricanes at Lang Park. He was selected again for the Australian Under 20 team in 2015.

References

External links
 Queensland Reds profile
 It's Rugby stats

1995 births
Australian rugby union players
Australian sportspeople of Tongan descent
Queensland Reds players
Queensland Country (NRC team) players
Rugby union flankers
Living people
Rugby union players from Auckland